Vilas Rupawate (born 16 March 1967) is an Indian politician from the state of Maharashtra, working for the betterment of Dalits, devadasis and widows. In 2011, he joined the Indian National Congress.

He became the General Secretary of the Maharashtra Pradesh Congress Committee in January 2013, later he became President of Nirathar Nirashrit Vyakti Vikas Vibhag under the Maharashtra Pradesh Congress Committee on 25 September 2011. The total strength of members of the cell in the entire Maharashtra state lacks about 9. Since last so many years our organisation is deeply and profoundly involved to provide all types of help to the homeless, widows, devadasi, blind and disabled, educated jobless, and unorganized workers.

Rupawate is founder of "Vilasbhau Rupwate Pratishthaan" which works with "Maharashtra Niraadhar Mahila Sanghatana" and "Maharashtra Devdasi Mahila Sanghatana" that put efforts for providing better facilities to widows and devadasis, respectively. The group had organized a raasta roko protest at Kasarwadi near Pimpri-Chinchwad in June 2009.

References

1967 births
Marathi politicians
Indian National Congress politicians from Maharashtra
Social workers
Living people
Politicians from Mumbai
Social workers from Maharashtra